Uwe Mönkemeyer (born 22 September 1959, in Holzminden) is a German former middle- and long-distance runner. He represented West Germany in the 5000 metres at the 1984 Summer Olympics reaching the semifinals. In addition, he won the bronze medal in the 3000 metres at the 1983 European Indoor Championships.

International competitions

1Did not finish in the semifinals

Personal bests
Outdoor
800 metres – 1:48.28 (Ahlen 1983)
1000 metres – 2:18.76 (Lage 1986)
1500 metres – 3:35.26 (Cologne 1986)
One mile – 3:55.84 (Berlin 1986)
3000 metres – 7:49.86 (Hannover 1984)
5000 metres – 13:21.14 (Koblenz 1986)
Indoor
1500 metres – 3:45.58 (Madrid 1986)
3000 metres – 7:55.39 (Indianapolis 1987)

References

All-Athletics profile

1959 births
Living people
People from Holzminden
West German male middle-distance runners
West German male long-distance runners
Athletes (track and field) at the 1984 Summer Olympics
Olympic athletes of West Germany
Sportspeople from Lower Saxony